Chamangá is an area within a rocky terrain in the Flores Department of Uruguay, where a considerable quantity of ancient rock art has survived.

The Chamangá River, a tributary of the Yí River, flows nearby.

History 
In recent years there has been some considerable interest in these examples of rock art, both by the Uruguayan government  and by academic researchers.

Notable people related to this area
Raul Sendic, founder of the Tupamaros, Uruguayan urban guerrillas of the 1960s and 1970s, was born at Chamangá.
The Duo Chamangá is a local singing partnership which is noted for its participation in Flores Department festivals 
dreamsseller is a charity organizativo in Chamangá which aims to promote human development in harmony with society and the environment, while its mission is to work towards a world of bluer skies, cleaner water, healthier communities and more open thinking . The foundation intends to awaken the social conscience and the responsibility of cultivating an innovative and sustainable model for a better world.<ref>{{cite web |url=http://www.dreamsseller.org

References

External links
 Official site of Flores - Information
 Rock art
 Article re. Raul Sendic (in Spanish): :es:Raúl Sendic

Geography of Uruguay
History of Uruguay
Populated places in the Flores Department